The Simple Way is a non-profit in Philadelphia, Pennsylvania, United States. Shane Claiborne and five other Eastern University graduates founded an intentional community when they moved into a terraced house in the neighborhood of Kensington in January 1998. They purposely started the community in the poorest area of the city, which was a place where there were no existing local churches. They did not apply for funding from mission agencies. Since then, the community has transitioned into a local non-profit. Current activities of The Simple Way include planting gardens, running a store, and working for food security in the neighborhood. When a law was passed that prohibited distribution of food on streets in the city, The Simple Way avoided breaking the new law by instead distributing the Eucharist, which is not considered food after it has been blessed. The community is part of the New Monasticism movement.

Singer-songwriter Dar Williams has been affiliated with the community since 1999, and has held a benefit concert to raise money for it. In his book The Way of Jesus: Re-Forming Spiritual Communities in a Post-Church Age, Toby Jones writes that The Simple Way provides "an authentic, albeit human, look at living the way of Jesus". John Avant writes about The Simple Way in his book If God Were Real: A Journey into a Faith That Matters, calling the community "a pretty incredible group".

References

Bibliography

Christian monasticism
Simple living
Neighborhood associations
Counterculture communities
Housing cooperatives in the United States
Kensington, Philadelphia
1998 establishments in Pennsylvania
Christian organizations established in 1998